Malas in Ayurveda, the waste products of the body. The malas are grouped as "TRIMALA"(Three Waste products) which include urine, stool, and sweat as the basic principal malas. In Ayurveda the excreta of eyes, ears, nose; tears; nails; hair are also included in the mala. 
Effective elimination of malas is said to be important for maintaining good health. It is one of the pillars that constitute to the basic structure & functioning of the body.

References

External links
 Significance of Mala
 Ayurveda Ruokavalio
 Ayurveda Ama

Ayurveda
Hindu philosophical concepts